Rose of Tralee is a 1942 British musical film directed by Germain Burger and starring John Longden, Lesley Brook and Angela Glynne. The screenplay concerns an Irish singer who heads to America to pursue their dream of stardom.

Cast
 John Longden as Paddy O'Brien
 Lesley Brook as Mary O'Brien
 Angela Glynne as Rose O'Brien
 Mabel Constanduros as Mrs Thompson
 Talbot O'Farrell as Tim Kelly
 Gus McNaughton as Gleeson
 George Carney as Collett
 Virginia Keiley as Jean Hale
 Iris Vandeleur as Mrs Crawley
 Morris Harvey as McIsaac

See also
The Rose of Tralee (song)
Rose of Tralee (1937 film)

References

External links

1942 films
1942 musical films
British black-and-white films
British musical films
1940s English-language films
1940s British films